Chung Chou University of Science and Technology (CCUT) is a private university located in Yuanlin City, Changhua County, Taiwan.

History
CCUT was originally established as Chung Chou Vocational Institute of Engineering in 1969. In 1991, the school name was changed to Chung Chou Junior College of Technology and in 2000, the name was changed again to Chung Chou Institute of Technology. It was finally renamed the Chung Chou University of Science and Technology on 1 August 2011. In 2015, the university had been put under observation for quality issues.

International student exploitation 
In January 2022, The Reporter reported CCUT luring overseas students to Taiwan illegally. The students, who were found through brokers had to commit to paying higher tuition fees and were forced to work overtime in factories to pay back these fees. The college promised to provide English courses and scholarships to international students. Once the students signed up, the classes turned out to be taught fully in Chinese, and the students were required to get high scores to be qualified for any scholarship. When one of the students changed his school, the college threatened the student with governmental deportation measures.

In response to the incident, the principal was resigned and officials were arrested. The Ministry of Education ordered the college to stop admissions. On November 2022, the college announced the school will be closed in Auguest 2023.

Faculties
 College of Engineering
 College of Health
 College of Management

Transportation
The university is accessible within walking distance East from Yuanlin Station of the Taiwan Railways.

See also
 List of universities in Taiwan

References

External links

 

1969 establishments in Taiwan
Educational institutions established in 1969
Private universities and colleges in Taiwan
Universities and colleges in Changhua County
Universities and colleges in Taiwan
Technical universities and colleges in Taiwan